The Pan American Youth Athletics Championships is an athletics event organized by the Association of Panamerican Athletics (APA) open for youth (U18) athletes from member and associate member associations. The inaugural competition took place in Cali, Colombia in 2015.

Editions

Championships records

Boys

Girls

Mixed

References

Youth
Under-18 athletics competitions
Recurring sporting events established in 2015
2015 establishments in Colombia
Biennial athletics competitions